XXV is the 25th-anniversary studio album by Polish death metal band Vader, released in 2008 by Regain Records. The album is a collection of re-recorded songs from earlier Vader albums, from The Ultimate Incantation up to The Beast. The special edition includes three bonus tracks and a bonus third DVD, with an old and rare live VHS containing footage from throughout the band's career. XXV was recorded between July 2007 and March 2008 at Hertz Studio in Białystok, Poland and produced by  Wojtek and Sławek Wiesławscy. The album is the last Vader release that features guitarist Maurycy "Mauser" Stefanowicz and drummer Dariusz "Daray" Brzozowski, and the only studio recording with bassist Marcin "Novy" Nowak.

The release was preceded by the single "v.666", issued on 15 January 2008. A music video was shot for the song "Carnal", directed by Carlos Abysmo.

Track listing

Personnel 
Production and performance credits are adapted from the album liner notes.

 Vader
 Piotr "Peter" Wiwczarek − lead guitar, bass, lead vocals, lyrics, executive producer
 Maurycy "Mauser" Stefanowicz − rhythm guitar, backing vocals
 Marcin "Novy" Nowak − bass, backing vocals
 Dariusz "Daray" Brzozowski − drums

 Additional musicians
 Krzysztof "Siegmar" Oloś (Vesania) – guest keyboards
 Roman Kostrzewski (KAT) – guest vocals
 Robert "Pierścień" Pierściński (Dead Infection) – guest vocals
 Seth Van De Loo (Severe Torture) – guest vocals
 Tomasz "Hal" Halicki (Hermh) – guest bass

 Production
 Paweł Wasilewski – lyrics
 Paweł Frelik – lyrics
 Tomasz Krajewski – lyrics
 Łukasz Szurmiński – lyrics
 Jacek Wiśniewski – cover art
 Sławomir & Wojciech Wiesławscy – production, mastering, mixing
 Agnieszka Krysiuk – photos
 Massive Music Management – management
 Note
 Recorded, mixed and mastered at Hertz Studio July 2007 – March 2008.

v.666 

v.666 is the sixth single by the Polish death metal band Vader. It was released only in Poland on 15 January 2008 by Empire Records. The release features two songs "Carnal (v.666 Version)", and "Vicious Circle (v.666 Version)".

Track listing

Release history

References 

Polish-language compilation albums
Vader (band) albums
2008 compilation albums
2008 video albums
2008 live albums
Live video albums
Regain Records albums